The Benjamin Gachet House (historically spelled Gachette) is a historic residence on GA 18, 3 miles west of Barnesville, Georgia. It was added to the National Register of Historic Places on April 17, 1997. The home is located at the crossing of Five Points Road and Piedmont Road, now known as the Milner Cross Roads, originally used as trails by Native American tribes.

The General LaFayette connection

Benjamin Gachet was a French nobleman who fled from a revolution in San Domingo and settled in what is now Lamar County. A historical marker dedicated by the Lamar-LaFayette Chapter of N.S.D.A.R. is at the site, stating that General Marquis de LaFayette stayed with Gachet at the home on March 19, 1825, during an official visit to Georgia.

Additionally, Benjamin Gachet lived in Jones county adjacent to Baldwin county, where Milledgeville was being visited by General LaFayette in 1825. Historians surmise that the general visited Gachet around that time and location. 

So a family connection existed between the Gachets and the LaFayettes.

The home

The home was placed on the register, in part, due to it being an almost pristine example of plantation plan architecture. The chimneys and much of the clapboards are original. The kitchen, on the back of the house, off of the porch, was rebuilt. The two front bedrooms originally had separate entrances for each. The rooms have been referred to as "traveler's rooms", "preacher rooms" and "stranger's rooms". The Gachet house was known as a stagecoach stop in its history. Benjamin Gachet died at age 36 leaving several minor children and Mrs. Gachet likely earned a living to support her children by operating this stagecoach stop.

Caroline M. Gachet

Mrs. Gachet eventually sold the property to her son-in-law, Benjamin M. Milner, and moved to Alabama.

The gravesite of Caroline M. Gachet (November 12, 1792 USA -  December 24, 1876) is believed to be at the Enon Cemetery in Bullock County, Alabama.

See also
National Register of Historic Places listings in Lamar County, Georgia
Visit of the Marquis de Lafayette to the United States
Gilbert du Motier, Marquis de Lafayette

Notes

Photos at NRHP induction
NRHP photos

Line Drawings
Sketch plan
Home (1 of 3)
Home (2  of 3)
Home (3 of 3)

References

External links
Panoramio photograph of the home

Houses on the National Register of Historic Places in Georgia (U.S. state)
Houses in Lamar County, Georgia
National Register of Historic Places in Lamar County, Georgia